Christoforos Bakaoukas (born 20 November 1979 in Salamina, Greece) is a former professional handball right wing who last played for AEK Athens H.C.

Clubs
Ionikos Nea Filadelfeia (1998–05)
AEK Athens H.C. (2005–2016)

Honours
 AEK Athens H.C
 2 Greek Men's handball championship: 2011, 2013
 3 Greek men's handball cup: 2009, 2013, 2014

References

1979 births
Living people
Greek male handball players
People from Salamis Island
Sportspeople from Attica